Arvind Mohan Kayastha (born August 1, 1960) is an Indian Biologist. He has been a professor at Banaras Hindu University since 1990, and has been coordinator of its School of Biotechnology since 2013. He is a fellow of the National Academy of Sciences, India and the National Academy of Agricultural Sciences.

Education and career
Kayastha earned his B.Sc. in 1979 and M.Sc. in biochemistry in 1982 from Banaras Hindu University. He earned a Ph.D. in enzymology from Banaras Hindu University in 1988 under the guidance of O. P. Malhotra.  Following his Ph.D., Kayastha was a postdoctoral associate at National Institutes of Health and at the University of California, Riverside.

Kayastha specializes in plant biochemistry and enzyme technology. He has been on the editorial boards of several journals in related fields including the Journal of Plant Biochemistry and Biotechnology and Agricultural Research, both published by Springer Science+Business Media.

References

1960 births
Academic staff of Banaras Hindu University
Living people
Scientists from Varanasi
People from Dharamshala
Scientists from Himachal Pradesh
Indian biochemists
Indian agronomists
Fellows of The National Academy of Sciences, India
Fellows of the National Academy of Agricultural Sciences